Loughor Rugby Football Club is a rugby union Club representing the town of Loughor, Swansea, South Wales. Loughor RFC is a member of the Welsh Rugby Union and is a feeder club for the Ospreys. Rugby was first played in Loughor in 1882, with evidence of two distinct teams forming in the upper and lower parts of the village. The team from the lower end of the village were called Bwlch-y-mynydd and played in green, while the upper team played in a black strip.

The first competitive competition involving Loughor was when they joined the Swansea and District Rugby League in the 1910–11 season.

Throughout the late 1990s to the present day Loughor have risen rapidly through the ranks of Welsh rugby thanks to the foresight of the club management committee.

Club honours
 West Wales Rugby Union Cup 1952/53 - Winners
 West Wales Championship 1953/54 - Champions

External links
Loughor RFC

References

Rugby union in Swansea
Rugby clubs established in 1882
Welsh rugby union teams